Falcatimonas is a Gram-positive and strictly anaerobic bacterial genus from the family of Clostridiaceae with one known species (Falcatimonas natans). Falcatimonas natans has been isolated from a methanogenic reactor which was filled with cattle waste.

References

Clostridiaceae
Bacteria genera
Monotypic bacteria genera
Taxa described in 2016